Chavibdeh (also Romanized as Chavībdeh; also known as Cavib-deh, Choo Abdeh, Chovīdeh, Chūbīdeh, Chū'ebdeh-ye Yek, Chū'ībdeh, Chūybdeh, Chwaibdeh, Covideh, Javībdeh, Kuwaibdeh, and Kūyab Deh) is a city in Shalahi Rural District, in the Central District of Abadan County, Khuzestan Province, Iran. At the 2006 census, its population was 6,491, in 1,154 families.

References 

Populated places in Abadan County
Cities in Khuzestan Province